From My Mind to Yours is a 2015 studio album by Richie Hawtin. It was released through Plus 8 on 11 December 2015 to celebrate the 25th anniversary of the record label. It features productions under Hawtin's own name and his aliases Plastikman, Robotman, Childsplay, F.U.S.E., 80xx, Circuit Breaker, and R.H.X. It peaked at number 20 on the UK Dance Albums Chart.

Track listing

Charts

References

External links
 From My Mind to Yours official website
 

2015 albums
Richie Hawtin albums